Bush Policemen is a 10-minute Australian documentary about the work done by a policeman in the Australian Outback. It was released to cinemas as a supporting feature.

It was directed by Lee Robinson who later made a drama feature film set in the same milieu, Dust in the Sun.

References

External links

Documentary films about law enforcement
1953 short films
Australian short documentary films
Law enforcement in Australia
Documentary films about Aboriginal Australians
1953 films
1953 documentary films
Films directed by Lee Robinson
1950s short documentary films
Australian black-and-white films
1950s English-language films